Ridin' The Tiger is the first album released by Gluecifer.

Track listing
The songwriting credits on the album refers to several well-known musicians, however these artists did not actually participate in the songwriting for this album. The credits are  tributes to musicians that inspired the band.

1997 albums
Gluecifer albums